Tuberculosis is a high priority agenda in the National Health Policy of Pakistan. Health Department Khyber-Pakhtunkhwa planned and implemented “TB Eradication Program NWFP (Khyber-Pakhtunkhwa)” to control TB in the Province in 2000, through a PC-1 for duration of five years (2000–2005). Foreign aided PC-I for 2005–2008 was then approved and extended to 31 December 2009. A new PC-I of Rs.142.22 million for 3 years i.e. 2009–2012 has been approved by the Government comprising purely of Government component, which shows Government commitment to eradicate TB from the Province.

Facts about TB 

 According to WHO estimates, one third of world population is infected with TB.
 Eight million people develop active TB annually all over the world.
 Two million people die of TB every year.
 Pakistan ranks 5th among high burden TB countries in the world.
 There are about 4,20,000 new TB cases in Pakistan each year.
 An estimated 55,000 new TB cases occur in Khyber-Pakhtunkhwa every year.
 A sputum smear positive TB patient can infect 10–15 persons/year.

About the programme 

Programme Mission is TB free Khyber-Pakhtunkhwa. Programme goal is to reduce TB prevalence & death rates by 50% by 2015 relative to 1990. Implementation target is to detect at least 70% of new sputum smear positive cases and cure at least 90% of these cases. TB is a high priority agenda in the National Health Policy. Health Department Khyber-Pakhtunkhwa planned and implemented “TB Eradication Program” to control TB in the Province in the year 2000, through a PC-1 for duration of five years (2000–2005).

Foreign aided PC-I for 2005–2008 was then approved and extended to 31 December 2009. GTZ provided technical assistance and KFW yielded financial assistance in this PC-I. Counterpart component was Rs.29.668 million. Currently the Programme is functioning under a PC-I of Rs.142.22 million for 3 years i.e. 2009–2012, which purely is Government component and shows the commitment of the Government to control TB in the Province.

The Programme Follows WHO recommended DOTS (Directly Observed Treatment Short course) strategy to address TB concern effectively.

TB Surveillance System in Khyber-Pakhtunkhwa 

TB Control Programme, Khyber-Pakhtunkhwa is the only programme which has its own web based Electronic Recording and Reporting System (tbdatakp.gov.pk). It is the case based recording system which provides access to every patient's record and to monitor performance of each BMU and district. It was developed in last quarter of 2009 with financial support from AGEG-KfW and was launched in 1st quarter of 2010.

The basic objective was to have a system which can help to generate error free report and to strengthen the TB surveillance system. TB Control Programme, KP was maintaining TB data in MS Excel Files since 2002 which was holding data collected from districts and consolidating to generate province report but the quality of the data was always in question and chances of errors were high because of manual collection and generation of reports by the district TB control officers.

Introduction of ERS addressed many issues. Now DOTS facilitator at district TB control office enter TB patient's data from TB03 register just like he/she enter it in TB03 itself, the system records it along with its follow-up data and generate WHO standard reports at the end of each quarter. Also it performs analysis on the reports to show the progress and performance of the BMU, District and Province. With the help of ERS district TB control officer and provincial TB control authority can access and monitor the data of patients registered in periphery.

TB control programme upgraded their system in January, 2011. Keeping in view the feed backs from the districts. The system has the capacity to be upgraded further and new features can be introduced to strengthen it more, it can be attached to increase its scope to other TB related activities and to help TB management staff by getting quality data in real time.

TB Diagnostic Centers in Khyber-Pakhtunkhwa

District Abbottabad 

 District TB Office
 Ayub Teaching Hospital
 Civil Hospital Nathia Gali
 Civil Hospital Sherwaan
 Civil Hospital Boi
 Rural Health Centre Havelian
 Rural Health Centre Lora
 TB Association Centre

District Battagram 

 District TB Office
 Civil Hospital Thakot
 Rural Health Centre Banna
 Rural Health Centre Kooza Banda

District Bannu 

 District Headquarters Hospital
 Rural Health Centre Domail
 Rural Health Centre Kakki
 Rural Health Centre Ghoriwala
 Anti TB Association Geneva Bannu Township

District Buner 

 District Headquarters Hospital Dagar
 Civil Hospital Pacha killi
 Civil Hospital Totalai
 Rural Health Centre Chamla
 Rural Health Centre Nagrai
 Rural Health Centre Juwar
 Noor Medical Centre

District Charsadda 

 District Headquarters Hospital
 Tehsil Headquarters Hospital Tangi
 Civil Hospital Shabqadar
 Rural Health Centre Battagram
 Rural Health Centre Jamalabad
 Rural Health Centre Sherpao
 Basic Health Unit Nisatta
 Basic Health Unit Utmanzai
 PPM /STCP
Rural Health Unit Umer zai

District Chitral 

 District Headquarters Hospital
 Tehsil Headquarters Hospital Daroosh
 Tehsil Headquarters Hospital Booni
 Rural Health Centre Ayun
 Rural Health Centre Garam Chasma
 Rural Health Centre Mastuj
 Rural Health Centre kaghuzi
 Basic Health Unit Arandu
 Boomi Medical Centre
 Family Health Centre Chuinj
 Family Health CentreHarchin
 Family Health Centre Bang
 Family Health Centre Shagram
 Family Health Centre Garam Chashma
 Extended Family Health Centre Shogore

District Dera Ismail Khan 

 District TB Office
 Civil Hospital Daraban Kalan
 Civil Hospital Chaudhwan
 Civil Hospital Kulachi
 Civil Hospital Panyala
 Rural Health Centre Paharpur
 Rural Health Centre Kot Jai
 Rural Health Centre Parowa
 Rural Health Centre Kiri Shamozai
 TB Association Centre

District Hangu 

 District Headquarters Hospital
 Civil Hospital Thall
 Civil Dispensary Doaba
 Rural Health Centre Naryab

District Haripur 

 District Office
 District Headquarters Hospital
 Civil Hospital Khalabat TownShip
 Civil Hospital Rehana
 Central Jail Haripur
 Rural Health Centre Kot Najibulla
 Rural Health Centre Khanpur
 Rural Health Centre Sari Niamat Khan
 Rural Health Centre Sirikot
 Rural Health Centre Ghazi
 Rural Health Centre Nara Amazai

District Karak 

 District TB Office
 District Headquarters Hospital
 Tehsil Headquarters Hospital B.D Shah
 Civil Hospital Takhti Nasrati
 Civil Hospital Bahadar Khel
 Civil Hospital Teri
 Rural Health Centre Ahmad Abad
 Rural Health Centre Nari Panos
 Rural Health Centre Latambar
 Rural Health Centre Sabir Abad

District Kohat 

 District Headquarters Hospital
 Liaqat Memorial Women & Children Hospital
 Civil Hospital Shakardara
 Rural Health Centre Lachi
 Rural Health Centre Gumbat
 Rural Health Centre Ustar Zai
 Rural Health Centre Chor Lakki
 TB Association Centre

District Kohistan 

 District TB Office
 Rural Health Centre Shatyaal
 Rural Health Centre Pattan
 Basic Health Unit Ranoulia

District Lakki Marwat 

 District Headquarters Hospital
 City Hospital
 Rural Health Centre Titter Khel
 Rural Health Centre Sarai Gambila
 Rural Health Centre Sarai Naurang
 Rural Health Centre Landiwah
 Rural Health Centre Tajori
 TB Association Centre
 MMM Hospital

District Lower-Dir 

 District Headquarters Hospital Timergara
 Tehsil Headquarters Chakdara
 Civil Hospital Samar Bagh
 Rural Health Centre Gulabad
 Rural Health CentreTalash
 Rural Health Centre Munda
 Rural Health Centre Lal Qila
 TB Association Centre ouch DOTs facilitator/microscopist nawaz khan cell#0345/9394206
PPM/ACD public private mix
private labs
1, TBC Ouch Lab 2, lifecare lab timergara 3, Qazi lab timergara 4, fazal rahim lab timergara 5, alfalah lab timergara 6, musarat/shawkat HC
PPM GPs/ Doctors
Dr, Qazi ikram timergara, Dr, sanaullah ouch, Dr, shahzad khan ouch, Dr, shakirullah asbanr, Dr, M R Shaheen chakdara, Dr, fazal baseer gulabad, Dr, khaista rahman talash, Dr, sameullah chakdara Dr, Fahad talash, Dr, Mehbob khan munda, Dr, ashfaq ur rahman timergara, Dr, tariq hasan timergara, Dr, shawkat ali timergara, Dr, noor Islam timergara, Dr nisar ahmad timergara, Dr, M Tahir timergara, Dr. Fida mohd timergara, Dr. Hafiz ur rahman timergara

District Malakand 

 District Headquarters Hospital Batkhela
 Tehsil Headquarters Dargai
 Civil Hospital Thana
 Civil Hospital Totakan
 Rural Health Centre Julagram
 Rural Health Centre Sakhakot
 TB Association Centre Batkhela

District Manshera 

 District TB Office
 District Headquarters Hospital
 Civil Hospital Baffa
 Civil Hospital Battal
 Civil Hospital Gari Habibullah
 Civil Hospital Balakot
 Civil Hospital Oghi
 Civil Hospital Darband
 Rural Health Centre Shinkiari
 Rural Health Centre Chather Plan
 Rural Health Centre Chowki
 Rural Health Centre Lassan Nawab
 Rural Health Centre Oghi Charbagh
 General & Mental Hospital Dadar
 Basic Health Unit Khathai
 Anti TB Association Geneva Ahl

District Mardan 

 District TB Office
 Mardan Medical Complex
 Civil Hospital Lundkhwar
 Civil Hospital Rustam
 Rural Health Centre Katlang
 Rural Health Centre Shahbaz Garhi
 Rural Health Centre Sher Garh
 Rural Health Centre Takht Bhai
 Rural Health Centre Toru
 TB Hospital Baghdada Mardan
 TB Association Centre Takht Bhai
 PPM/STCP

District Nowshera 

 District TB Office
 Emergency Satellite Complex Hospital Pabbi
 Civil Hospital Ziarat Kaka Sahib
 Civil Hospital Akora Khattak
 Rural Health Centre Dak Ismail Khel
 Rural Health Centre Khair Abad
 Rural Health Centre Kheshki
 Rural Health Centre Manki Sharif
 Rural Health Centre Nizampur
 Basic Health Unit Taru Jaba
 PPM /STCP

District Peshawar 

 District TB Office
 Lady Reading Hospital
 Khyber Teaching Hospital
 Hayatabad Medical Complex
 Govt.City Hospital Kohat Road
 Agha Khan Family Hospital
 Cantt. General Hospital
 Civil Hospital Mattani
 Central Jail Hospital
 Federal Government Hospital
 Fauji Foundation Hospital
 Infectious Diseases Hospital Haji Camp
 Kuwait Teaching Hospital
 Kai Japan Hospital
 Mission Hospital
 Police Hospital
 Railways Hospital
 Social Security Hospital
 Wapda Hospital
 TB Centre Ganj
 Rural Health Centre Badaber
 Rural Health Centre Gara Tajak
 Rural Health Centre Nahaqi
 PTCL Dispensary
 Basic Health Unit Budhai
 Green Star (Good life)
 Child Center City Govt Hosp Peshawar
 PPM /STCP

District Shangala 

 District Headquarters Hospital Alpuri
 Civil Hospital Besham
 Civil Hospital Chakesar
 Civil Hospital Puran
 Rural Health Centre Karora
 District TB Office

District Swabi 

 District Headquarters Hospital
 Civil Hospital Topi
 Civil Hospital Kalu Khan
 Rural Health Centre Ambar Kunda
 Rural Health Centre Yar Hussain
 Rural Health Centre Marghuz
 Basic Health Unit Gani Chatra
 Basic Health Unit Tordher
 Basic Health Unit Dobain
 Rural Health Center Yar Hussain
 T.B Chest Clinic Kalu Khan

District Swat 

 District Headquarters Hospital Swat
 Tehsil Headquarters Hospital Matta
 Civil Hospital Kalam
 Civil Hospital Madyan
 Civil Hospital Kabal
 Civil Hospital Manglawar
 Civil Hospital Barikot
 Civil Hospital Khawazakhela
 Rural Health Centre Chuprial
 Rural Health Centre Deolai
 Pakistan Anti TB Association Clinic

District Tank 

 Tehsil Headquarters Hospital
 Rural Health Centre Gomal Bazar
 Rural Health Centre Amma Khel
 Christian Hospital

District Upper-Dir 

 District Headquarters Hospital
 Rural Health Centre Barawal Bandai
 Rural Health Centre Wari
 Rural Health Centre Patrak
 Rural Health Centre Bebure

See also 

 Pakistan
 Khyber-Pakhtunkhwa
 Tuberculosis
 Electronic Reporting System

References

Tuberculosis in Pakistan
Health in Khyber Pakhtunkhwa